El Nacional is a newspaper published in Tarija, Bolivia.

References

Newspapers published in Bolivia
Mass media in Tarija